In mathematics, base change may mean:
Base change map in algebraic geometry
Fiber product of schemes in algebraic geometry
Change of base (disambiguation) in linear algebra or numeral systems
Base change lifting of automorphic forms